Andrew Jackson (born March 16, 1992) is an American football linebacker who is a free agent. He was drafted by the Indianapolis Colts in the sixth round of the 2014 NFL Draft. He played college football at Western Kentucky.

College career
Jackson played college football at Western Kentucky.

Professional career

Indianapolis Colts
Jackson was drafted by the Colts in the sixth round (203rd overall) of the 2014 NFL draft. He played in 13 games during the 2014 season, making 10 total tackles and 1 quarterback sack. He was waived on February 11, 2015.

Spokane Empire
On August 30, 2016, Jackson signed with the Spokane Empire of the Indoor Football League.

Memphis Express
In 2019, Jackson joined the Memphis Express of the Alliance of American Football. In the fourth game of the 2019 AAF season against the San Diego Fleet, Jackson recorded 14 tackles, a sack, and an interception as the Express won 26–23; he was later named AAF Defensive Player of the Week. The league ceased operations in April 2019.

Houston Roughnecks
Jackson was drafted in the 7th round during phase three in the 2020 XFL Draft by the Houston Roughnecks. He was waived during final roster cuts on January 22, 2020.

St. Louis BattleHawks
Jackson signed with the St. Louis BattleHawks on February 18, 2020. His contract was terminated when the league suspended operations on April 10, 2020.

Duke City Gladiators
Jackson signed with the Duke City Gladiators on April 27,2021

References

External links
Western Kentucky Hilltoppers bio

1992 births
Living people
Sportspeople from Lakeland, Florida
Players of American football from Florida
American football linebackers
Western Kentucky Hilltoppers football players
Indianapolis Colts players
Spokane Empire players
Memphis Express (American football) players
Houston Roughnecks players
St. Louis BattleHawks players